Chornobaivka is a suburban village in Kherson Raion, Kherson Oblast, southern Ukraine. It is the center of the village council. It hosts the administration of the Chornobaivka rural hromada, one of the hromadas of Ukraine. Kherson International Airport is situated in Chornobaivka.

History

Founding 
Chornobaivka was founded officially on August 18, 1782, by the Zaporozhian Sich Cossack Petro Chornobay, after he received a plot of land from Catherine II. The settlement's name is derived from him.

Development 
Chornobaivka grew slowly. From the documents of the Kherson provincial zemstvo, it is known that in 1859 the village had 60 yards, in which 239 people lived. The main income of Chornobaivka's inhabitants was the extraction of limestone. There were no trade enterprises on the farms at that time, except for wine shops. Healthcare resources were limited. The first school was opened in the late nineteenth century and was attended by 26 boys and 6 girls.

In 1902, a primary school for a small number of children was opened in Chornobayiv Khutory.

World War II 
During World War II, Nazi Germany occupied Chornobaivka starting 9 August, 1941. In 1942, the Nazis began forcibly deporting the town's young people back to Germany. Over the occupation, 242 people were deported and pressed to do forced labor. Eventually, on 14 March, 1944, the 295th Rifle Division of the Red Army liberated the village.

Late 20th century and Ukrainian independence 
Throughout the early 1970s, "radical" development took place in Chornobaivka. Five main streets were paved with asphalt, new houses were built, a water system was laid out, and a radio network was formed.

In 2006, Kherson Airport, located in Chornobaivka, received international status.

2022 Russian invasion of Ukraine 

In the early stages of the 2022 Russian invasion of Ukraine, Russian forces took control of the airport. According to Ukrainian sources, Russian generals Andrei Mordvichev and Yakov Rezantsev were killed in a series of Ukrainian strikes on Chornobaivka. However, the Ukrainian claims of Mordvichev's death were rebutted after Mordvichev was confirmed alive after a video showing him meeting Ramzan Kadyrov in Mariupol. Rezantsev's death, however, remains unconfirmed.

The town was liberated by Ukrainian troops on 11 November 2022 during the 2022 Kherson counteroffensive.

Geography 
Chornobaivka is located in the south of Ukraine within the steppe zone on the Black Sea lowland of the Eastern European plain. The settlement is located 10 km from the regional center. The physical distance to Kyiv is 414 km.

Transportation 
Chornobaivka can be reached by minibus № 101.

Climate

Notable people 
 Aleksey Kirichenko, Soviet politician.
 , writer and humorist.
 , Soviet and Ukrainian innovator of agricultural production, twice Hero of Socialist Labor (1966, 1986). Hero of Ukraine (2002).

Demographics 
According to the 2001 census, 9275 people lived in the village. The native language distribution of Chornobaivka in 2001 was:

References

Bibliography 

 
Villages in Kherson Raion
Populated places established in 1782
Chornobaivka rural hromada
Khersonsky Uyezd